Afe Babalola University (ABUAD) is a private university located in Ado-Ekiti, Ekiti State, Nigeria. It was founded by a lawyer and philanthropist, Afe Babalola, in 2009.  Afe Babalola University offers Academic programs in six Colleges: Sciences, Law, Engineering, Social and Management Sciences, Medicine and Health Sciences, and Postgraduate Studies. The Engineering College built on three and half acres of land and is reputed to be one of the largest in Africa. The college was inaugurated by former President Goodluck Jonathan.

Campuses
The university has one main campus which is located in Ado-Ekiti, Ekiti State, Nigeria. The campus is situated in the hilly part of the town directly opposite the Federal Polytechnic Ado-Ekiti. The campuses houses 5 undergraduate colleges, a post graduate school, conference halls, a teaching hospital for medical students, student and staff accommodation, sporting facility and other auxiliary services such as cafeteria for staff and students, a laundry, a bakery and a water processing plant. The Afe Babalola University holds a reputation for being one of the few Nigerian universities to begin academic works in the campus permanent site. However, due to the requirement by the National University Commission that the school must possess a functioning teaching hospital, a memorandum of understanding with the Nigerian federal government to make use of the Federal Medical Center (FMC) Ido-Ekiti, Ekiti State as its teaching hospital for a period of ten years beginning from October 2014.

Academics

Admission requirement 
The admission requirement for the school varies between the different colleges. However, as with all Nigerian universities, for undergraduate programs the candidate is required to have at least 5 credits in subjects such as mathematics, English language and any other three subjects that are relevant to the course of study. The student is required to have passed the Joint Admission and Matriculation Board JAMB Unified Tertiary Matriculation Examination (UTME), after which the candidate is expected to take an oral interview with an academic staff of the prospective college before admission can be given. The university also offers direct entry admission to students who wish to transfer from another university or have undergone either an Advanced Level program or a degree foundation program. The level at which they are admitted into is decided by the college and varies among them.

Undergraduate colleges 
The university operates a collegiate system and has five major colleges. They are the College of Engineering, College of Medicine and Health Sciences, College of Sciences, College of Law and College of Social and Management Sciences. Some of the colleges offer post graduate programme in some departments.

The College of Law 
The College of Law is fully accredited by the National University Commission (NUC) of Nigeria, the college consist of fully furnished class rooms, a common room, a library containing law journals and articles and a moot court for students to have court practice session. There are a number of student chambers in the college backed by staff mentor who battle against each other in moot court session. Associate Prof. Elisabeta Smaranda Olarinde, (FCAI) is the pioneer provost of the college of law and is still the current provost of the college; she is also the acting vice chancellor of the university. The college of law which is regarded as one of the best law colleges in Nigeria offers both undergraduate and post-graduate degree (masters level) in law

 LL.B Law

The College of Engineering 
The college of engineering was accredited by both the NUC and COREN during their one-week visit to the college. The main engineering building which houses laboratories, a central engineering library, lecturer rooms, an auditorium, a central engineering workshop and a certified Festo training center. The engineering building is named after the former Nigerian president Dr. Goodluck Jonathan and was commissioned by him on 20 October 2013 during the university's first convocation ceremony.
Prof. Israel Esan Owolabi served as the pioneer provost of the college of engineering; he stepped down from the post in 2015 and he is currently engaged in teaching activities in the electrical/electronics engineering programme.

Academic programs
 B.Eng. Mechanical Engineering
 B.Eng. Mechatronic Engineering
 B.Eng. Electrical/Electronic Engineering
 B.Eng. Petroleum Engineering
 B.Eng. Civil Engineering
 B.Eng. Chemical Engineering
 B.Eng. Computer Engineering 
 B.Eng. Agricultural Engineering
 B.Eng. Biomedical Engineering
 B.Eng. Aeronautical and Astronautical Engineering

The College of Sciences 
The College of Sciences is one of the pioneer colleges of the university after the university's approval by the Nigerian University Commission (NUC). The university admitted students at inception on 4 January 2010.

Academic programs
 B.Sc. Microbiology
 B.Sc. Human Biology
 B.Sc. Biotechnology
 B.Sc. Biochemistry
 B.Sc. Chemistry
 B.Sc. Industrial Chemistry
 B.Sc. Computer Science
 B.Sc. Geology.
 B.Sc. Physics with Electronics
 B.Sc. Physics
 B.Sc. Petroleum Chemistry
 B.Arch Architecture

The College of Social and Management Sciences 
At inception, on 4 January 2010 the university admitted students into the College of Social and Management Sciences, being one of the pioneer colleges of the university. The session ran smoothly without hitches from 4 January to August 2010. The second session of the university started on October 4, 2010, with over 1,000 students.
So far the university has maintained strict compliance with its academic calendar which makes it possible for students to pre-determine their possible date of completion of their programmes even before enrolment. It has been the policy of the university to post on-line students’ results within 24hours of approval by the Senate.

Academic programs
 B.Sc. Economics
 B.Sc. Accounting
 B.Sc. Banking and Finance
 B.Sc. Business Administration
 B.Sc. Tourism and Events Management.
 B.Sc. Political Science
 B.Sc. International Relations and Diplomacy
 B.Sc. Peace and Conflict Studies
 B.Sc. Intelligence and Security Studies
 B.Sc. Social Justice
 B.Sc. Communication and Media Studies
 B.Sc. Marketing
 B.Sc. Entrepreneurship
 B.Sc. Sociology

The College of Medicine and Health Sciences 
The college commenced activities in October 2011 having been approved by National Universities Commission.

Academic programs
 Medicine and Surgery (M.B.B.S)
 B.NSc. Nursing Sciences
 B.MLS. Medical Laboratory Science
 B.Sc. Anatomy
 B.Sc. Physiology
 B.Sc. Human Nutrition and Dietetics
 B.Sc.  Pharmacology
 B.Sc. Public Health
 Pharm.D Pharmacy
 B.DS. Dentistry
 OD. Optometry

The College of Arts and Humanities 

Academic programs
 B. A. Performing Arts
 B. A. English
 B. A. History and International Studies
 B. A. Linguistics

The College of Agriculture 

Academic programs
 B. Agric. Animal Science
 B. Agric. Agricultural Economics
 B. Agric. Extension Education
 B. Agric. Crop Science
 B. Agric. Soil Science

Postgraduate college 
The university operates a collegiate system and has five major Postgraduate colleges. They are the College of Engineering, College of Medicine and Health Sciences, College of Sciences, College of Law and College of Social and Management Sciences.

Footnotes

Further reading
 "I want to live beyond 114 years – Afe Babalola," The Punch News, 4 Aug. 2013.

External links
Afe Babalola University Official Website

Afe Babalola University
Educational institutions established in 2009
2009 establishments in Nigeria
Private universities and colleges in Nigeria
Education in Ekiti State